Archips oporana, also known as the pine tortrix or spruce tortrix is a moth of the family Tortricidae, found in Asia and Europe. It was first described by Carl Linnaeus in 1758.

Description
In western Europe the moth flies from late May to July, and there is a partial second generation in August and September.

The larvae initially feed in September tying two sets of twin needles and attach the middle part to the branch of the host plant. A single larva may feed on seven or eight of these sets of needles per day. They overwinter in a silken tube among the needles. The following year, the larva eat new shoots and may bore into the stem, which can cause them to shrivel and break off. On juniper the larva spins a thick white web amongst the leaves. Pupation is in the larval habitation in June and July. Larva can be found on silver fir (Abies alba), European larch (Larix decidua), common juniper (Juniperus communis), spruce (Picea species), Scots pine (Pinus sylvestris) and  cedars (Thuja species).

Distribution
The moth is found in most of Europe and in Asia it is found in China (Heilongjiang, Liaoning), Korea, Japan and Russia (Primorye).

References

External links
 Waarneming.nl .
 Lepidoptera of Belgium

Archips
Moths described in 1758
Moths of Asia
Tortricidae of Europe
Taxa named by Carl Linnaeus